Joseph Labitzky (4 July 1802 in Krásno – 18 August 1881 in Karlovy Vary) was a Bohemian composer, violinist, and conductor. He studied with Karl Veit in his youth. Labitzky joined a traveling orchestra at age 14, and in 1820 took a position in an orchestra in Marienbad. In 1823-24 he was in Munich, and following this he toured Germany as a concert violinist. He put together his own orchestra in 1825, touring Vienna and Warsaw. He took a conducting position in Karlsbad in 1835, and his dance pieces became quite popular throughout Europe, including England. He was involved in "Cocks vs Purday", a British court case concerning copyright. He was the father of August Labitzky. Labitzky composed 300 dance pieces.

He was overshadowed by Johann Strauss later in his life.

Selected works
 L'adieu: Romance sans paroles for viola and piano, Op.286 (1872)

References
Andrew Lamb, "Joseph Labitzky". The New Grove Dictionary of Music and Musicians. London: Macmillan, 2001.

Web sources

External links
 
 

1802 births
1881 deaths
People from Krásno (Sokolov District)
People from the Kingdom of Bohemia
German Bohemian people
Czech male classical composers
Austrian classical composers
Austrian male classical composers
Czech Romantic composers
19th-century classical composers
19th-century conductors (music)
19th-century violinists
Male violinists